Obliveon is a Canadian progressive death/thrash metal band from Quebec.

History
The band was formed in 1987 as Oblivion, but changed the spelling after discovering a band of the same name in the United States. Obliveon's second album, the self-released Nemesis, has since been "lauded as a tech metal cornerstone." According to Canvas Solaris drummer Hunter Ginn, Nemesis "[sounds like] the very essence of tech." After releasing four studio albums, Obliveon disbanded in 2002 but has reunited occasionally over the years, and they have discussed the possibility of writing new material.

Band members
Stéphane Picard - bass, vocals (1987-1994); bass, backing vocals (1994-2002, 2007-2008, 2014, 2021-present)
Martin Gagné - guitar (1987-2002, 2007-2008, 2014, 2021-present)
Alain Demers - drums (1989-2002, 2007-2008, 2014, 2021-present)
Pierre Rémillard - guitar (1989-2002, 2007-2008, 2014, 2021-present)
Bruno Bernier - vocals (1994-2002, 2007-2008, 2014, 2021-present)
Francis Giguère - drums (1987-1989)

Discography

Studio albums
From This Day Forward (1990)
Nemesis (1993)
Cybervoid (1995)
Carnivore Mothermouth (1999)

Other releases
Whimsical Uproar... (demo, 1987)
Fiction of Veracity (demo, 1989)
Planet Claire (EP, 1998)
Greatest Pits (compilation, 2002)

References
Footnotes

Works cited

Musical groups established in 1987
Musical groups disestablished in 2002
Musical groups reestablished in 2007
Musical groups disestablished in 2008
Musical groups reestablished in 2014
Musical groups disestablished in 2015
Musical groups reestablished in 2019
Canadian progressive metal musical groups
Canadian thrash metal musical groups
Canadian death metal musical groups
Musical groups from Montreal
English-language musical groups from Quebec